Lucas Clayton Sikma (born July 30, 1989) is an American professional basketball player for Alba Berlin of the Basketball Bundesliga (BBL).  He is the son of former National Basketball Association (NBA) Hall-of-Famer Jack Sikma.

High school career
Sikma, a 6'8" power forward, played high school basketball for Bellevue High School in Bellevue, Washington.  He was a late bloomer, growing 7 inches over two years and only making the varsity team as a junior and senior.  As a result, he was not highly recruited.  Ultimately he chose to sign with the University of Portland.

College career
Despite his modest reputation coming into the Portland Pilots program in 2007, Sikma was able to make an immediate impact, starting 23 of the team's 31 games and averaging 6.1 points and 7.3 rebounds per game.  After steady production as a sophomore and junior, Sikma stepped up his game significantly as a senior.  He averaged a double-double at 12.9 points and West Coast Conference-leading 10.5 rebounds per game.  He was named to the All-WCC first team.  In his college career, Sikma scored 1,048 points (8.3 per game) and graduated as the Pilots' all-time leading rebounder with 987 (7.8 per game).

Professional career
Sikma was not selected in the 2011 NBA draft.  He signed with UB La Palma of Spain's second division (LEB Oro) for the 2011–12 season.  He averaged 11.8 points and 7.7 rebounds before moving to Autocid Ford Burgos the following season.  For the 2013–14 season Sikma moved up to the Spanish first division (Liga ACB), signing with CB Canarias.

After spending two years in Canarias with notable performances, Sikma signed for two years with Valencia Basket. In 2017, Sikma won the Liga ACB with Valencia after beating Real Madrid 3–1 in the league finals.

On July 5, 2017, Sikma signed with German club Alba Berlin of the Basketball Bundesliga (BBL). On April 28, 2018, Sikma was named the BBL Most Valuable Player and to the All-BBL First Team. On June 12, 2019, Alba Berlin announced a four-year extension of Sikma's contract.

References

External links
Spanish League profile
Portland Pilots bio

1989 births
Living people
Alba Berlin players
American expatriate basketball people in Germany
American expatriate basketball people in Spain
American men's basketball players
American people of Dutch descent
Basketball players from Washington (state)
CB Canarias players
Liga ACB players
Portland Pilots men's basketball players
Power forwards (basketball)
Sportspeople from Bellevue, Washington
UB La Palma players
Valencia Basket players